Udupiddy is a small town in Sri Lanka located south of Valvettithurai within the Northern Province. Uduppiddy has two national schools. They are; Uduppiddy American Mission College and Uduppiddy Girls' College.

See also
List of towns in Northern Province, Sri Lanka

External links

 
Towns in Jaffna District
Vadamarachchi South West DS Division